This is a list of the operas written by the German-speaking Bohemian composer Florian Leopold Gassmann  (1729–1774).

List

References
Sources
Kosman, Joshua (1992), 'Gassmann, Florian Leopold' in The New Grove Dictionary of Opera, ed. Stanley Sadie (London) 

 
Lists of operas by composer
Lists of compositions by composer